Thurgarton railway station is a Grade II listed station which serves the village of Thurgarton in Nottinghamshire, England.

History
It is on the Nottingham to Lincoln Line, which was engineered by George Stephenson and opened by the Midland Railway on 3 August 1846. The contractors for the line were Craven and Son of Newark and Nottingham; the station buildings are in the neo-Tudor style and were probably designed by Thomas Chambers Hine.

At the station much of the original décor remains apart from the electric barriers added later.

Stationmasters

J. Howitt 1846 - 1865
C. Brown 1865 - 1866
John Kind 1866 - 1898
Job Frederick Fisher 1898 - 1921 (formerly station master at Bleasby)
Sidney Richard Holden ca. 1924 - 1932 (afterwards station master at Ullesthorpe)
J.F. Georgeson from 1937 (also station master at Lowdham)
H. Simpson ca. 1950

Facilities
The station is unstaffed and offers limited facilities other than two shelters, timetables and modern help points. The full range of tickets can be purchased from the guard on the train at no extra cost as there are no ticket issuing facilities at this station.

Services
All services at Thurgarton are operated by East Midlands Railway.

The typical off-peak service is:
 1 train every 2 hours to  via 
 1 train every 2 hours to 

Gallery

References

External links

Railway stations in Nottinghamshire
DfT Category F2 stations
Former Midland Railway stations
Railway stations in Great Britain opened in 1846
Railway stations served by East Midlands Railway
Grade II listed buildings in Nottinghamshire
Thomas Chambers Hine railway stations